The frontoethmoidal suture is the suture between the ethmoid bone and the frontal bone.

It is located in the anterior cranial fossa.

References

External links
 

Bones of the head and neck
Cranial sutures
Human head and neck
Joints
Joints of the head and neck
Skeletal system
Skull